Derek Charles Blasberg (born April 22, 1982) is an American journalist, socialite, author, and television personality who works in the fashion industry. As of 2018, he is the head of fashion and beauty partnerships at YouTube and is a senior staffer at Gagosian.

Early life and family
Blasberg was born in St. Louis, Missouri, to Bill Blasberg, a certified public accountant, and Carol Blasberg, the managing editor of the medical journal The Annals of Thoracic Surgery. In 2000, Blasberg graduated from Affton High School, where he was salutatorian of his class.

Career

College years and early career
In 2000, Blasberg moved to New York City to attend New York University. He graduated in 2004 

During college, Blasberg worked at the model agency Elite Model Management writing bios for models. He got the job by befriending a model who lived in his dorm. He worked a similar position for European agency Models 1 during a semester abroad in London.

Blasberg had a part-time position at W magazine during his junior year of college. In his senior year, he began working as an assistant at Vogue magazine and continued working there full time after graduating college.

Writing
From 2006 to 2010, Blasberg was the Editor at Large of Style.com, where he wrote a column called "The Blasblog."

In 2008, Blasberg edited Influence, a fashion and art tome conceived by Mary-Kate and Ashley Olsen.

From 2009 to 2012, he wrote a column called "Fast + Louche" for Interview magazine. Blasberg co-wrote several of the New York City editions of the Louis Vuitton Travel Guides.

In April 2010, Blasberg's debut book, Classy: Exceptional Advice for the Extremely Modern Lady, was published. It was a collection of humorous essays about etiquette and was on The New York Times best sellers list for several weeks. In October 2011, Blasberg published a follow-up to Classy called Very Classy: Even More Exceptional Advice for the Extremely Modern Lady, which was an expanded and updated version of the original.

In 2014, Blasberg worked at the Gagosian Gallery as a senior staffer. In this position, Blasberg wrote the "In Conversation" series for Gagosian Quarterly.

Before joining Vanity Fair in 2015, Blasberg was the Editor at Large of Harper's Bazaar. Blasberg was an Editor at Large a V and VMAN. He was the founding U.S. Editor of the London-based arts publication Garage Magazine where he wrote a column called "Emails from the Edge."

In 2015, Blasberg published Harper's Bazaar: Models, a survey of the most important models and iconic images in fashion history, which has a foreword that was written by Karl Lagerfeld.

Television
Starting in 2015, Blasberg hosted several Vanity Fair magazine web series, including "Conversations In The Backseat," where he has interviewed Reese Witherspoon, Gigi Hadid, Naomi Campbell, Maria Sharapova, and Rosie Huntington-Whiteley.

He was also the host of the popular series "Derek Does Stuff With a Friend", which was one of Conde Nast Entertainment's first franchises.

Since April 2016, Blasberg has been the host of the CNN International show, CNN Style. CNN Style focuses on covering fashion internationally, but also includes art, architecture, and design. CNN Style was created 15 years after the long-running Style with Elsa Klensch.

Fashion consultant
As a fashion editor, Blasberg has collaborated with Karl Lagerfeld, David Bailey, Terry Richardson and Marilyn Minter. Blasberg has worked as a consultant on creative projects for fashion brands that included Chanel, MAC Cosmetics, Opening Ceremony, where he had a stationery line the "Handwritten Letter Helper," and Tiffany's.

Personal life
Blasberg lives in New York with his long-time partner, Nick Brown, a venture capitalist. On May 18, 2021, Blasberg and Brown became fathers to twins: a boy named Frederick Noah and a girl named Elizabeth Grace, who were born to a surrogate.

Filmography
 2010-2012: America's Next Top Model (TV Series) – 2 episodes: "Patrick Demarchelier" and "Georgina Chapman"
 2012: 24 Hour Catwalk (TV Series) – Judge
 2012: Fashion Fetish (Short Film) – Concept, Script, Actor
 2012: Sh*t Fashion Girls Say (Short Film)
 2014: The Approval Matrix (TV Series) – Panelist
 2015: Fashionably Late with Rachel Zoe (TV Series)
 2015: Love Advent (TV Series short)
 2015-2016: Vanity Fair magazine's "Conversations in the Backseat" – 2 seasons (11 episodes)
 2016–present: CNN Style with Derek Blasberg (TV Series)
 2017: Odd Mom Out (TV Series) – 1 episode:  "M.F.A. in B.S."
 2018: Ocean's 8

Works and publications

Books

References

External links 

 
 Derek Blasberg at Condé Nast Traveler
 Derek Blasberg at Interview
 Derek Blasberg at V
 Derek Blasberg at Vanity Fair

American male journalists
American male bloggers
American bloggers
American editors
American socialites
Living people
Writers from St. Louis
New York University alumni
1982 births
American LGBT journalists
LGBT people from Missouri
21st-century American non-fiction writers
21st-century American LGBT people
Vanity Fair (magazine) people